Beeston Tor railway station was a minor station which served the Beeston Tor in Grindon, Staffordshire. The site is now part of the Manifold Way.

Route

References

Disused railway stations in Staffordshire
Railway stations in Great Britain opened in 1904
Railway stations in Great Britain closed in 1934
1904 establishments in England
1934 disestablishments in England
Former Leek and Manifold Light Railway stations